Kang Kon Military Academy is a military educational institution located in the city of Pyongyang, in the Democratic People's Republic of Korea. The location is near Pyongyang International Airport. It was named after Kang Kon.

References 

 
Education in Pyongyang